Admiral Sir George Lambart Atkinson-Willes  (13 July 1847 – 25 December 1921) was a Royal Navy officer who went on to be Commander-in-Chief, East Indies Station.

Naval career
Educated at Leamington College and at Burney's Royal Naval Academy in Gosport, he joined the Royal Navy as a cadet in 1861 and took part in the Abyssinian Expedition in 1868 where he was second in command of the naval rocket brigade.

He was appointed commodore commanding the Training Squadron in 1895 and then commanded the Dockyard Reserve at Chatham from 1898.

In 1901 he assumed the additional surname of Willes in compliance with the will of his uncle Admiral Sir George Ommanney Willes. Later the same year he was promoted to rear admiral, and in May 1902 he became Second-in-Command of the Home Fleet. He hoisted his flag on board the pre-dreadnought battleship  on 7 May 1902, as his flagship during the Coronation Fleet Review for King Edward VII.

In 1903 he was appointed Commander-in-Chief, East Indies Station. He led a squadron of three ships during the Somaliland Campaign in 1904, supplying landing parties that stormed and captured the forts at Illig, his ships' guns supporting the attack. In June 1905 in recognition of his service in Somaliland he was made a Knight Commander of the Order of the Bath.

Atkinson-Willes was promoted vice admiral in 1905 and admiral in 1908. He retired in July 1912 and died in December 1921, aged 74.

References

1847 births
1921 deaths
Royal Navy admirals
Knights Commander of the Order of the Bath